Mardanas Island is an island in the municipality of Sitangkai, Tawi-Tawi. It is officially known as Siluag in the 1939 Census Atlas of the Philippines, however locals and the Philippine Navy disputes this name. It is one of the last islands of the Sulu Archipelago nearest the Philippine-Malaysian border and is next to Panguan Island.

See also

 List of islands of the Philippines
 Philippine Navy
 Andulinang Island
 Panguan Island
 Panampangan Island

References

External links

Mardanas Island at OpenStreetMap

Islands of Tawi-Tawi